Purple Haze is the fourth studio album by Harlem rapper Cam'ron. The album was released on December 7, 2004, by Cam'ron's Diplomat Records, Jay-Z & Damon Dash's Roc-A-Fella Records distributed by Def Jam Recordings. The release of this album was delayed several times from November 2003, the first single "Get Em Girls" was released a year prior to the actual album release. The album debuted at number 20 on the Billboard 200 with 123,000 copies sold in its first week. The album was certified Gold by the Recording Industry Association of America (RIAA).

Critical reception

Purple Haze received generally positive reviews from music critics. At Metacritic, which assigns a normalized rating out of 100 to reviews from mainstream critics, the album received an average score of 72, based on 7 reviews.

David Drake of Stylus Magazine praised the album for its "bombastic production and surreal lyricism" and Cam's "unique brand of idiosyncratic gangsta" being wildly engaging because of his absurd, poker-faced delivery, concluding that "Purple Haze is such a twisted take on gangsta that it has to be heard to be believed." Blender contributor Jonah Weiner noted how the production throughout the record moves between "aggressively insane ("Shake")" to "adore pop (the Cyndi Lauper-interpolating "Girls Just Wanna Have Fun")" while Cam matches that balance with wordplay that's "Missy gibberish swathed in 50 Cent menace," concluding that he "writes pop hooks and avant-garde rhymes while staying as close to the streets as a manhole cover." Chris Ryan from Spin gave credit to Cam for tightening his signature flow, choosing quality and risk-worthy beats, and maintaining listener interest while delivering "Harlem symbolism and non-sensical muttering" throughout the album. AllMusic editor Andy Kellman was mixed about the tracks on the record, finding "Girls" and "Harlem Streets" to be weak inclusions but praised the contributions from Kanye West ("Down and Out"), Pop & Versatile ("Soap Opera") and the Heatmakerz ("More Gangsta Music"). He also commented that the "Diplomat-affiliated material" being released alongside it that year may cause their fanbase to suffer burnout from too much content. Nathan Rabin of The A.V. Club commended the album for adopting the hyper-soul style of Roc-A-Fella's sound throughout the track listing but criticized Cam's lyric delivery for being similar to nursery rhymes, saying that it "lumbers drearily through a sea of gangsta-rap clichés."

Online music magazine Pitchfork placed Purple Haze at number 114 on their list of the Top 200 Albums of the 2000s. Pitchfork writer Sean Fennessey said, "Call this a personal project for a relentlessly distant artist; an asshole's lament. Purple Haze is simultaneously a refined, perfectly A&R-ed follow-up and one of the most confusing, crude full-lengths ever."

Track listing

Sample credits
"More Gangsta Music" contains a sample of "Woman I Need You" by Sizzla.
"Get Down" contains a sample of "Life's Opera" by Marvin Gaye. 
"Leave Me Alone Pt. 2" contains a sample of "Bajo Fuego" by Jerry Goldsmith.
"Down And Out" contains a sample of "Strung Out" by William Bell & Mavis Staples.
"Harlem Streets" contains a sample of "Theme from Hill Street Blues" by Mike Post.
"Girls" contains a sample of "Girls Just Want to Have Fun" by Cyndi Lauper.
"Soap Opera" contains a sample of "Merry-Go-Ride" by Smokey Robinson.
"Bubble Music" contains a sample of "Blues Dance Raid" by Steel Pulse.
"More Reasons" contains a sample of "Reasons" by Earth, Wind & Fire.
"The Dope Man" contains a sample of "Funky Worm" by Ohio Players.
"Hey Lady" contains a sample of "I Want to Be Your Man" by Roger Troutman.
"Get 'Em Girls" contains a sample of "Carmina Burana - O Fortuna" by Carl Orff.
"Dip-Set Forever" contains a sample of "Forever" by Chuck Cissel.

Personnel
Credits for Purple Haze adapted from AllMusic.

Cam'ron – executive producer
Kareem "Biggs" Burke – executive producer
Traxster – mixing
Tony Dawsey – mastering
Bang – producer
Carlisle Young – mixing
Charlemagne – producer
Eric "Ebo" Butler – mixing
Cam'ron – producer
Oluwaseye Olusa – photography
Kanye West – producer
Chad Hamilton – producer
Traxster – producer
The Heatmakerz – producer
Versatile – producer
Skitzo - producer
Ryan Press – producer
Duke Dagod – A&R
Nasty Beatmakers – producer
 Stay Gettin' productions – producer
Robert Sims – art direction
Antwan "Amadeus" Thompson – producer
Travis Cummings – artist coordination
Ty Tracks – producer
Jamel George – artist coordination
Monica Morrow – stylist
Shalik Berry – artist coordination
Mike Peters – vocals
Rick Patrick – creative director
Jim Jones – vocals
Juelz Santana – vocals
Mike T. – engineer
Jaconda "Ms" Blunt – vocals
Carlisle Young – engineer
Latrice "Grease" Carter – vocals
Eric "Ebo" Butler – engineer
Sarah Hinds – vocals
Mike Peters – engineer
Steven "Opera Steve" Santiago – vocals
Milwaukee "Protools King" Buck – engineer
Dave Irving – vocals
Damon Dash – executive producer

Charts and certifications

Weekly charts

Year-end charts

Certifications

References

2004 albums
Cam'ron albums
Def Jam Recordings albums
Albums produced by Kanye West
Albums produced by The Legendary Traxster
Albums produced by the Heatmakerz
Roc-A-Fella Records albums
Diplomat Records albums